Zhernakova House is a building in Tsentralny City District of Novosibirsk, Russia. It was constructed in 1912. The house is an architectural monument of regional significance.

History
The house belonged to the tradeswoman Maria Danilovna Zhernakova, she owned several houses in Novonikolayevsk (current Novosibirsk), which she rented out.

See also
 Ikonnikova House

Bibliography
 

Buildings and structures in Novosibirsk
Tsentralny City District, Novosibirsk
Residential buildings completed in 1912
Cultural heritage monuments of regional significance in Novosibirsk Oblast